Nobutoki (written: 信時 or 信祝) is a masculine Japanese given name. Notable people with the name include:

 (1683–1744), Japanese daimyō
 (died June 1556), Japanese daimyō

Nobutoki (written: 信時) is also a Japanese surname. Notable people with the surname include:

 (1887–1965), Japanese composer and cellist

Japanese-language surnames
Japanese masculine given names